HireRight is a global family of background screening companies based in Nashville, Tennessee.

Acquisitions and mergers

Powerchex 

On June 23, 2010, HireRight announced that it had acquired Powerchex, a UK-based pre-employment screening company specialising in the financial services sector in the City of London. Powerchex was a full member of the UK chapter of the National Association of Professional Background Screeners or NAPBS, and was started by Alexandra Kelly in 2005 who is the former managing director and owner of the company.

In October 2010, Powerchex was rebranded as HireRight.

Both Powerchex and Kroll Background Screening (below) are now fully owned subsidiaries of HireRight.

Powerchex research 

Every year Powerchex commissioned the Shell Technology and Enterprise Programme to conduct market research into trends in applicant fraud.

2007 research discovered that almost 90% of undisclosed criminal records are found on temporary employee CVs.

In 2008 research, Powerchex found that 43% of applicants from the UK’s lowest ranking universities had some form of major embellishment hidden on their application, compared to just 14% of applicants from the top-twenty rated schools. It also found that maths and science graduates are more honest than arts graduates, who have a particularly high rate of major embellishment. The findings were published in the national press including the Financial Times, The Times, The Daily Telegraph, and BBC News Online.

The Guardian reported on 2009 research funded by Powerchex that found a 29% increase of CV misinformation following the 2008 recession.

Kroll 
On August 3, 2010, HireRight then-parent company Altegrity Risk International announced it had completed the acquisition of Kroll Inc. from Marsh & McLennan Companies in an all-cash transaction valued at US$1.13 billion. In October 2010, Kroll Background Worldwide was rebranded as HireRight.

On March 13, 2018, it was reported that Duff & Phelps Corp. would buy Kroll, Inc. (which did not include background screening portion of the former Kroll business that had been rebranded with HireRight brands).  On June 4, 2018, the transaction was completed.

General Information Services 

On Friday, May 25, 2018, HireRight and General Information Services (GIS) announced their intent and agreement to a merger. The companies announced the closing of the merger on July 12, 2018. The resulting combined group is the largest provider of background screening services in the United States. Following the merger, HireRight rebranded, with both HireRight and GIS using the new branding.

J-Screen and PeopleCheck 
On October 12, 2019, HireRight announced the acquisition of J-Screen in Japan and PeopleCheck in Australia.

Legal issues with service 

HireRight was the subject of a number of class-action and Fair Credit Reporting Act (FCRA) lawsuits. In 2011 the company paid $28 million to plaintiffs who accused HireRight of failing to provide copies of reports to job applicants and failing to resolve disputes. And on August 8, 2012, the US Department of Justice announced HireRight settled charges of violating the FCRA for $2.6M.

Companies that use background check services must follow FCRA procedures or face class-action liability with millions of dollars in exposure. According to a Wall Street Journal investigation into hiring practices in the trucking industry, class-action lawsuits were brought against trucking companies over how they use HireRight. HireRight customer U.S. Xpress settled in 2013 for $2.75M, and Swift in 2014 for $4.4M over their failure to disclose hiring practices.

See also
Background check
Criminal record check
Governance, risk management, and compliance
Human resources
Recruitment
Security clearance
Vetting

References

External links 
 

Companies based in Irvine, California
American companies established in 1995
Business services companies established in 1995
Business services companies of the United States
Companies listed on the New York Stock Exchange
2021 initial public offerings